Jonathan David Armogam (born 9 January 1981 in Cape Town, Western Cape) is a South African footballer who played for Vasco da Gama and Engen Santos in the Premier Soccer League. He can play as a midfielder and a striker.

References

1981 births
Living people
Sportspeople from Cape Town
Cape Coloureds
South African soccer players
Association football forwards
Bush Bucks F.C. players
Santos F.C. (South Africa) players
Vasco da Gama (South Africa) players
Association football midfielders
South African Premier Division players
National First Division players

Currently is a dedicated teacher at LivingstoneHighschool.